Ouachita Parish High School is a high school located in unincorporated Ouachita Parish, Louisiana, United States, near Monroe. It is administrated by the Ouachita Parish School Board. It is fully accredited by the Southern Association of Colleges and Schools. The school mascot is the Lion.

Ouachita Parish High School is the oldest school in northeast Louisiana, being founded in 1894. The school has been located in three different buildings. Two of these are registered on the National Register of Historic Places.

Athletics
Ouachita Parish High athletics competes in the LHSAA. The Lions participate in district 2-5A and Louisiana 5A.

Football
Ouachita's football team won the 1989 state championship and was runner-up in 1941 and 1994. The rivalry with West Monroe High School is often referred to as the "Rebel-Lion", referring to the mascots of the schools, Rebels and Lions. The Rebels' twenty-seven game winning streak ended in 2021, when the Lions, led by first year head coach Todd Garvin, defeated the Rebels 35–34 in double overtime.

Championships
Football Championships
(1) State Championship: 1989

Dance team
The Ouachita Dandylions is a nationally-honored dance team consisting of 35 girls. The Dandylions participate in national competition each year in Orlando, Florida. The dance team rivals are the Neville High School Bengal Belles.

Band 
The Pride of Ouachita Marching Band is one of the high school marching bands in the Monroe/ West Monroe Area. They have been awarded a number of Grand Champions, recently receiving Grand Champions at the 2019 Sterlington High School Marching Competitions.
Rivals are West Monroe High School Rebel Marching Band.

Notable alumni

William Derwood Cann, Jr. (Class of 1937), World War II lieutenant colonel and mayor of Monroe from 1978 to 1979
Julie Giroux, composer
Jarrius Jackson, former professional basketball player
Larry Lolley, judge
Wojciech Myrda, former professional basketball player
William Wiley Norris, III (Class of 1954, 1936-2016), city, state, and circuit court judge from West Monroe 
Robert E. Powell, former mayor of Monroe
Don Redden, former professional basketball player
Cam Sims, American football player for the Washington Football Team
Jonathan Wilhite, former professional football player  
J. Robert Wooley (Class of 1971), Louisiana insurance commissioner from 2000 to 2006

Notable faculty
Pat Patterson, baseball coach from 1958 to 1963, former Louisiana Tech baseball coach

See also 
 List of high schools in Louisiana

References

Schools in Ouachita Parish, Louisiana
Public high schools in Louisiana
Buildings and structures in Monroe, Louisiana
1894 establishments in Louisiana